Zimani David Kadzamira (born 1 July 1941 in Harare, Zimbabwe) is a Malawian academic, civil servant and diplomat. He was the Vice-Chancellor of the University of Malawi until 2009.

Early life and education
Kadzamira was born in Salisbury, Rhodesia (now Harare, Zimbabwe) in July 1941. He attended primary school there before returning to Nyasaland (now Malawi) for secondary school. He then moved to the United States, where he graduated from Princeton University with a degree in political science in 1966. He graduated from the University of Manchester in 1974 with a doctorate in government.

Academia
Kadzamira has worked with the University of Malawi in some respect since 1966. Since joining as an assistant lecturer, he has worked as a full professor and eventually as administrator. He was Vice-Chancellor of the University of Malawi until 30 November 2009 when Dr. Emmanuel Fabiano was appointed as the eighth Vice Chancellor.

Public service
Kadzamira has served Malawi internationally a number of times over his career. He served on the committee for the Supreme Council for Sports in Africa for Zone VII (1987–1992), the WorldFish Center (1990–1995) and as ambassador to Japan from 1992–1994. In February 2007, he was appointed as chairman of the UbuntuNet Alliance, which advocates for high-speed internet connectivity for National Research and Education Networks (NRENs) connecting research and education institutions across Africa. He also served as the first Malawian Ambassador to Japan.

References

1941 births
Living people
People from Harare
Princeton University alumni
Alumni of the University of Manchester
Academic staff of the University of Malawi
Malawian political scientists
Malawian civil servants
Malawian diplomats
Ambassadors of Malawi to Japan
Vice-chancellors of universities in Malawi